27A may refer to :

27A, a 1974 Australian drama film directed by Esben Storm
27A, a variant name for the A27 battery
RS-27A,  a liquid-fuel rocket engine developed in 1980s by Rocketdyne for use on the Delta II and Delta III launch vehicles
Truro 27A, a Mi'kmaq reserve located in Colchester County, Nova Scotia.
New York State Route 27A. a state highway
Fairchild F-27A, variant of the Fokker F27 Friendship twin-engined turboprop passenger aircraft
North Carolina Highway 27A (Thrift) section of the North Carolina Highway 27
North Carolina Highway 27A (Pee Dee) section of the North Carolina Highway 27

See also
A27 (disambiguation)